Florent Maree (born 17 November 1980) is a French gymnast. He competed at the 2000 Summer Olympics and the 2004 Summer Olympics. In 1998, he won the gold medal in the men's junior all-around event at the 1998 European Men's Artistic Gymnastics Championships held in Saint Petersburg, Russia.

References

1980 births
Living people
French male artistic gymnasts
Olympic gymnasts of France
Gymnasts at the 2000 Summer Olympics
Gymnasts at the 2004 Summer Olympics
People from Saint-Louis, Réunion
21st-century French people